The Royal Norwegian Ministry of Finance (Norwegian: Finansdepartementet) is a Norwegian ministry established in 1814. The ministry is responsible for state finance, including the state budget, taxation and economic policy in Norway. It is led by Trygve Slagsvold Vedum (Centre Party). The department must report to the Parliament of Norway.

Organization
The ministry is divided into the following sections:
 Political staff
 Information Unit
 Asset Management Department
 Budget Department
 Financial Markets Department
 Tax Law Department
 Tax Policy Department
 Economic Policy Department
 Department of Administrative Affairs

Subsidiaries
The following government agencies are subordinate to the ministry:
 Pension Fund Global
 National Insurance Scheme Fund
 Bank of Norway
 Norwegian Customs and Excise Authorities
 Norwegian Financial Supervisory Authority
 Norwegian Government Agency for Financial Management
 Norwegian National Collection Agency
 Norwegian Tax Administration
 Statistics Norway

The ministry also owns 19.1% of the Nordic Investment Bank

See also
 List of Norwegian Ministers of Finance

References

External links
 Official web site

Finance
Finance in Norway
Finance ministries
Public finance of Norway
Ministries established in 1814
1814 establishments in Norway